Skin (stylized as S.K.I.N.) is a United States-based Japanese visual kei rock supergroup founded by Japanese musicians Yoshiki, Gackt, Sugizo and Miyavi in 2007. The group's debut performance was on June 29, 2007 at Long Beach Arena, California. Although they had announced more activities, including a live tour and releasing a record, no new activities have occurred.

History

Conception and announcement

The origin of the band dates back to when Yoshiki invited Gackt to his Los Angeles mansion in 2002, where they decided to produce some music together.

The band was publicly announced in July 2006 at an Otakon conference where Yoshiki as a guest said, he would be starting a band with Gackt. He announced how the band would be composed of five members, and they are going to produce a recording with a live tour in 2007. In December of the same year, it was announced that Sugizo would be the third member and the first guitarist of the group. And then at the first "JRock Revolution Festival" on May 25, 2007, organized by Yoshiki, he officially announced that Miyavi would be the fourth member and second guitarist, and that Skin would be having its debut performance on June 29, 2007 at the anime expo in Long Beach. Yoshiki confirmed that the group was planning to release an album and that rough recordings of seven or eight songs were made in March 2007. With the well known members the band is considered a supergroup, causing their concert to be called the "Japanese rock concert of the century". Both Gackt and Yoshiki said that they want to be the first Asian band to conquer the world charts, beginning with America. Their aim was to open the market for Japanese artists in the Western music industry.

Debut concert
On June 12, premiere Skin concert tickets started to be released via the internet. However, massive interest led to flooding of the servers, causing them to crash, and in a few hours ticket reservations were temporarily stopped. On Thursday night of June 28, Skin performed for the first time at Long Beach Arena, supported on bass by Ju-ken, at the time a member of Gackt's live band. The concert began almost two and a half hours late, for unknown reasons. They performed around five songs, of which four were "Gei-Sha", "Killing you softly", "Beneath The Skin", "Violets", and most lyrics were in English and Japanese. During the intermediate of the performance of "Beneath The Skin", Gackt and Yoshiki both played piano, Sugizo was on violin and Miyavi played the traditional Japanese shamisen. At the end, Gackt announced that they would meet again.

2007–present
Since their debut performance, Skin has been inactive. All activity was suddenly stopped without any information and the future of the band still remains unclear.

According to Yoshiki, after the show the members were talking about the next step for the band. However, as the other members had their own projects going on, Toshi from X Japan called him and they talked for the first time in ten years and about possible X Japan reunion. He was not sure what to do next, decided to reunite X Japan for at least one time, but the reaction was overwhelming and when Sugizo joined X Japan's activity continued till today. Yoshiki stated that "it’s a little more like my fault, because I was not planning on doing X Japan at that time, then I started doing X Japan".

In a 2008 interview, Sugizo was asked about the band. He had said that at the meeting was concluded they would definitely continue to work together, but are all too busy to get together at the same time and place, and added "maybe from next year summer". After nothing happened the following year, in a 2009 interview he stated " I don't know... I think it will continue". In 2011 said that he does not want to give up the project, and that they should restart it. During a press conference in June 2010, Miyavi said he was honored being included in the group, and revealed that he would like to become active with Skin in the near future. In November 2011, he tweeted that he met with Yoshiki, and they talked about the band.

In 2010 interviews, Yoshiki said as he is currently working with X Japan and his solo project Violet UK, as well other members on theirs, it will be after them and it's not in his immediate thoughts. In a 2014 interview Yoshiki stated they're still talking about it and "there’s definitely a possibility we will be together, but at this point, we don’t have any specific plan". The song "Beneath The Skin", which Sugizo composed for the Skin, was covered and played by X Japan in 2014.

In November 2022, Yoshiki, Miyavi, and Sugizo announced their collaboration in a new supergroup, The Last Rockstars, with Hyde as a singer. The band also covered the song "Beneath The Skin".

Members
 Yoshiki – drums, piano
 Gackt  – vocals, piano
 Sugizo – guitar, violin
 Miyavi – guitar, shamisen

Session member
 Ju-ken – bass

References

External links
Archived promotional clip from Yoshiki.net

Visual kei musical groups
Japanese rock music groups
Rock music supergroups
Musical groups established in 2007
2007 establishments in California